Samuel Lane (1780–1859) was an English portrait-painter.

Life
The son of Samuel and Elizabeth Lane, he was born at King's Lynn on 26 July 1780. After a childhood accident he became deaf and partially dumb. He studied under Joseph Farington and then under Sir Thomas Lawrence who employed him as assistant.

Lane first exhibited at the Royal Academy in 1804, secured a large practice, and was a constant contributor for more than fifty years, sending in all 217 works. 
He lived in London at 60 Greek Street, Soho until 1853, and then retired to Ipswich; he sent his last contribution to the Academy in 1857. 
He died at Ipswich on 29 July 1859.

Works
His portraits included: Lord George Bentinck for the King's Lynn Guildhall; James Saumarez, 1st Baron de Saumarez for the United Service Club; Sir George Pollock and Sir John Malcolm for the Oriental Club; Charles Gordon-Lennox, 5th Duke of Richmond; Charles Blomfield, bishop of London; Thomas Clarkson for Wisbech Town Hall; Philip Broke for the East Suffolk Hospital; Thomas Coke, for the Norwich Corn Exchange; Luke Hansard for the Stationers' Company; Thomas Telford, Edmond Wodehouse, General William Loftus (MP), George Manby and other prominent persons. Lane was known for truthful likenesses; many of them were engraved by Charles Turner, Samuel William Reynolds, William Ward, and others.

References

Attribution

External links
 
 The portrait of  engraved by John Cochran for Fisher's Drawing Room Scrap Book, 1840 with a posthumous poetical illustration by Letitia Elizabeth Landon.

1780 births
1859 deaths
English artists
People from King's Lynn
Portrait painters